C4mim is a shorthand for the 1-n-butyl-3-methylimidazolium cation; where C4 refers to the butyl group. It is also abbreviated Bmim, and (rarely) Bumim. Salts containing this imidazole cation are ionic liquids. A common example of such is [C4mim][Cl], or 1-n-butyl-3-methylimidazolium chloride. Other examples include BMIM-PF6, [Bmim]BF4 and C4mim-FeCl4, the latter of which is a magnetic ionic liquid.

These salts are currently of interest in industry due to their ability to be infinitely recycled and their amenability to solvation at room temperature, making them excellent green solvents. C4mim is based on the parent compound 1-butyl-3-methylimidazole with one electron removed from the imidazole arene group. The stability of this cation lies in the fact that the resulting electronic vacancy is delocalised across the arene group, albeit unequally so.

See also 
Ethylammonium nitrate

External links 
 Press release from the EPA describing the use of C4mim

References

Ionic liquids
Solvents
Imidazolium compounds